Ferdinand Leontin Zylka (born 11 April 1998) is a German basketball player who plays for Circus Brussels of the BNXT League.

Professional career
In August 2021, Ferdinand Zylka signed with PS Karlsruhe Lions. The Lions stated that Zylka was their "king transfer" and expected him to be their leading player.

On June 20, 2022, he has signed with Circus Brussels of the BNXT League.

Player profile
Zylka plays the Shooting guard position. 
In August 2021, Lions' head coach Aleksandar Scepanovic stated that he values Zylka's ability especially as a three-point scorer and defender.

References

External links
Profile at Eurobasket.com
Profile at Karlsruhe Lions website
Profile at German ProA league website
Profile at 2017 FIBA Under-19 Basketball World Cup
German Basketball Federation profile
Profile at sport.de
Profile at scoutBasketball
Profile at RealGM
Profile at Instagram

1998 births
Living people
Basketball players from Berlin
Brussels Basketball players
German men's basketball players
Giessen 46ers players
Mitteldeutscher BC players
PS Karlsruhe Lions players
Rockets (basketball club) players
Shooting guards